Diamond Cats were a Czech girl group founded in 2009 when its four members left another girl group, 5angels. Diamond Cats consisted of Nikol Šneiderová, Kristýna Pecková, Hana Hladíková, and Kristýna Šlingrová, all aged 9–11 at the time of the group's inception.
In 2010, they released the album Showbyznys, whose title song went on to become their best-known hit. The YouTube music video for the song was viewed over 200,000 times in two months. Diamond Cats issued two more albums, Deja Vu (2011) and Na Dlani (2012), before splitting up in 2014.

Discography
 Showbyznys (2010)
 Deja Vu (2011)
 Na Dlani (2012)

References

External links
 

Czech children
Czech pop music groups
Czech women singers
Girl groups
Child musical groups
Musical groups disestablished in 2014
Musical groups established in 2009
2009 establishments in the Czech Republic
2014 disestablishments in the Czech Republic